Alexandre Auffredi was a wealthy bourgeois of the city of La Rochelle in France, who in 1196 sent a fleet of seven ships to Africa to tap the riches of the continent. He went bankrupt and went into poverty as he waited for the return of his ships, but they finally returned seven years later filled with riches.

As a result of the adventure, Auffredi became extremely rich. He devoted the rest of his life to help the poor, and founded the Saint barthelemy Hospital. A central area of La Rochelle was named after him.

Alexandre Auffredi is mentioned in Splendeurs et misères des courtisanes by Honoré de Balzac as an example of French entrepreneurship:

"Les fortunes colossales des Jacques Cœur, des Médici, des Ango de Dieppe, des Auffredi de La Rochelle, des Fugger, des Tiepolo, des Corner ..." Splendeurs et misères des courtisanes

12th-century French people
People from La Rochelle